Giovanni Antonio De Pieri, known as il Zoppo Vicentino (1671–1751) was an Italian painter of the Baroque style, born and active in Vicenza.

He was prolific locally in painting sacred subjects. He was dismissed by the art historian Lanzi as having an easy brush but less decisive. An inventory of art in Vicenza in 1769, cites the following works by Pieri: 
God the Father and Saints, Education of the Virgin, Flight to Egypt, and Madonna and Child at San Bartolomeo
Judith decapitates Holofernes at Santa Maria in Araceli
Canon Lateran Priest and Soldier at Corpus Domine church of Canons Lateran
St Antony and Child for parish church of Santa Croce
St Benedict for church of Santa Caterina
Arrival of the Holy Spine on organ shutters, an oval depicting Santa Rosa, and Ascent of Christ for a chapel in the church of Santa Corona
Deposition for parish church of San Marcello
Saints Benedict and Scholastica in Glory  for the church of Santi Felice e Fortunato
Apparition of Virgin to Beato Felice for the church of the Cappuccini
Martyrdom of San Apollonio for the church of La Misericordia
Virgin grants the Rosary to St Dominic with St Catherine of Siena for San Domenico
San Girolamo and Angels for San Marco in San Girolamo

References

1671 births
1751 deaths
People from Vicenza
17th-century Italian painters
Italian male painters
18th-century Italian painters
Painters from Vicenza
Italian Baroque painters
18th-century Italian male artists